XII Army Corps (German: XII. Armeekorps) was a corps in the German Army during World War II. It was formed in the Wehrkreis XII recruitment and training district in Wiesbaden in October 1936 and was mobilized before the outbreak of war at the end of August 1939.

At the start of World War II the corps were part of the 1st Army and based in the Saar region. In 1939 it fought with the 4th Army in Poland. In June 1940 they broke through the Maginot line to the Moselle near Nancy.

In Operation Barbarossa in June 1941 the corps were attached to Panzer Group 2 for the attack on the stronghold of Brest-Litovsk. After advancing further into Russia they were held up by Soviet counter-attacks.

Following Operation Bagration, the huge Soviet counter-attack in 1944, XII Corps were forced to retreat in bad condition and in July 1944 were finally destroyed in a pocket east of Minsk. General Müller was taken prisoner.

The corps was reformed in April 1945 to defend the middle Rhine and Thuringia under General Herbert Osterkamp.

Commanders

 Infantry General (General der Infanterie)  Walther Schroth, 4 February 1938 – 9 April 1940
 Colonel-general  (Generaloberst)  Gotthard Heinrici, 9 April – 17 June 1940
 Infantry General (General der Infanterie)  Walther Schroth, 17 June 1940 – 19 February 1942
 Infantry General (General der Infanterie) Walther Graeßner, 19 February 1942 – 18 February 1943
 Infantry General (General der Infanterie) Kurt von Tippelskirch, 18 February 1943 – 4 June 1944
 Lieutenant-general (Generalleutnant)  Vincenz Müller, 4 June – 5 July 1944
After reformation
 Artillery General (General der Artillerie)  Herbert Osterkamp, April 1945 –8 May 1945

Area of Operation

    Poland : September 1939 - May 1940
    France : May 1940 - June 1941
    Eastern Front, Central sector : June 1941 - May 1944
    Minsk : May 1944 - July 1944
    South-west Germany : July 1944 - February 1945

References

 Article based on equivalent articles (:de:Armeekorps (Wehrmacht)) on German Wikipedia and (:fr:10e corps d'armée (Allemagne) on French Wikipedia.

 Percy Ernst Schramm (Hrsg.): Kriegstagebuch des Oberkommandos der Wehrmacht, Bernard & Graefe Verlag für Wehrwesen, Frankfurt am Main 1965.
 Volume I: 1940/41 written by Hans-Adolf Jacobsen.
 Volume II: 1942 written by Andreas Hillgruber, Bernard & Graefe Verlag für Wehrwesen, Frankfurt am Main 1965.
 Voume III: 1943 written by Walther Hubatsch, Bernard & Graefe Verlag für Wehrwesen, Frankfurt am Main 1965.
 Georg Tessin: Verbände und Truppen der deutschen Wehrmacht und Waffen-SS im Zweiten Weltkrieg 1939 – 1945, Frankfurt/Main and Osnabrück 1966.
 Rolf Hinze: Zusammenbruch der Heeresgruppe Mitte 1944, Motorbuch Verlag Stuttgart 1992.
 Rolf Hinze: Das Ostfront Drama 1944, Motorbuch Verlag Stuttgart 1987.

Army,12
Military units and formations established in 1936
1936 establishments in Germany
Military units and formations disestablished in 1945